Necyria is a Neotropical metalmark  butterfly genus.

There are three species which all have colourful iridescent markings. They are forest insects. Some are part of mimetic complexes.

The genus was erected by John Obadiah Westwood in 1851. The subspecies shown in the taxobox is named in Westwood's honour.

Species
Necyria bellona
Necyria ingaretha Nicaragua.
Necyria duellona Panama,  Nicaragua,  Guatemala, Colombia , Ecuador , Brazil.

References
 Lamas G ed. 2004. Atlas of Neotropical Lepidoptera. Checklist: Part 4A Hesperioidea - Papilionoidea. Gainesville: Scientific Publishers/Association of Tropical Lepidoptera

External links
Funet Systematics.
 images representing Necyria at Encyclopedia of Life
images representing Necyria at Consortium for the Barcode of Life

Riodinini
Butterfly genera
Taxa named by John O. Westwood